Frank Satire is a journalist for the Kultura Newspaper: Articles: "Kultura" newspaper - Frank, author, radio newscaster and TV anchor. He attended the Sofia University.  Leo Burnett and Ogilvy & Mather

Life and career

References

Bulgarian journalists
Living people
Bulgarian emigrants to the United States
Year of birth missing (living people)